is a Japanese  actress and singer.

In Japan, she is well known for her performance as Sakura in the Otoko wa Tsurai yo series from 1969 until 1995. In addition, she has acted in many films directed by Yōji Yamada since the 1960s. She won the award for Best Actress at the 5th Hochi Film Award for A Distant Cry from Spring.

Voice acting
She sometimes performs as a voice actress, such as "Sophie" in Howl's Moving Castle in 2004. Although different voice actresses usually played young and old Sophie in the foreign dubs of the film, Baisho performed both roles alone, as well as the film's theme song.

Singing career
She has had a career as a singer since her debut with the song "Shitamachi no Taiyō" in 1962, for which she won the "newcomer award" of the Japan Record Award. Her 1965 single, "Sayonara wa dance atoni", a cha-cha ballad, later had its melody inspire the 1992 song Moonlight Densetsu, the theme song of the first four seasons for the anime adaption of Sailor Moon. A cover by Mariko Takahashi would later appear in another Ghibli film, Only Yesterday.

Personal
She is the older sister of Mitsuko Baisho, who is also an actress.

She is married to the Japanese composer .

Filmography

Honour
Kinuyo Tanaka Award (2001)
Medal with Purple Ribbon (2005)
Order of the Rising Sun, 4th Class, Gold Rays with Rosette (2013)

References

External links

  

 Talent Databank profile 

1941 births
Living people
Actresses from Tokyo
Japanese film actresses
Japanese television actresses
Japanese voice actresses
Japanese women singers
Asadora lead actors
Singers from Tokyo
Recipients of the Medal with Purple Ribbon
Recipients of the Order of the Rising Sun, 4th class
20th-century Japanese actresses
20th-century Japanese women singers
21st-century Japanese actresses
21st-century Japanese women singers